The Suzuki Palette is a kei car produced by Suzuki from January 2008 to February 2013. The Suzuki Palette has twin rear sliding doors, and competes directly with the Daihatsu Tanto. During 2009 the higher spec Suzuki Palette S models were replaced by the Suzuki Palette SW, whose revised frontal design is positioned to better compete with the Daihatsu Tanto Custom. Since the addition of the SW, the Suzuki Palette range has generally performed well in the sales charts. 

On December 1, 2009, the Nissan Roox was released, an OEM version of the Suzuki Palette that was first shown at the 2009 Tokyo Motor Show. The Nissan Roox Highway Star is a rebadged Suzuki Palette SW. On June 26, 2012, the Mazda Flair Wagon was released, another OEM version of the Palette.

The Palette was replaced in February 2013 by the Suzuki Spacia, with a corresponding new Mazda Flair Wagon launched simultaneously. The Nissan Roox was discontinued and replaced by Nissan Dayz Roox, a new model designed with Mitsubishi Motors. In 2020, the Roox nameplate returned as the replacement of Dayz Roox. The newer Roox is based on the second generation eK Space.

Palette
Cars introduced in 2008
Front-wheel-drive vehicles
All-wheel-drive vehicles
Kei cars
2010s cars
Hatchbacks